Daniel A. Lynch (born November 17, 1996) is an American professional baseball pitcher for the Kansas City Royals of Major League Baseball (MLB). He made his MLB debut in 2021.

Amateur career
Lynch played baseball at Douglas S. Freeman High School in Henrico, Virginia. As a junior, he compiled a 0.97 ERA. After high school, he enrolled at the University of Virginia where he played for the Virginia Cavaliers baseball team. During his freshman year at Virginia, he appeared in 13 games with nine starts and went 1–3 with a 5.49 earned run average (ERA) and 37 strikeouts. As a sophomore, he made 14 starts, going 7–5 with a 5.00 ERA with 45 strikeouts. The following summer in 2017, he pitched for the Orleans Firebirds of the Cape Cod League, where he made six starts and posted a 4–0 record with a 2.04 ERA and 25 strikeouts and was named a league all-star. During his junior season, Lynch went 4–4 over the course of 13 starts with a 3.96 ERA and 105 strikeouts.

Professional career
Lynch was selected by the Kansas City Royals with the 34th overall pick in the 2018 Major League Baseball draft. He signed with the Royals on June 10, 2018 for $1.7 million. He made his professional debut with the Burlington Royals of the Rookie-level Appalachian League before being promoted to the Lexington Legends of the Class A South Atlantic League. In 12 starts between the two clubs, he went 5–1 with a 1.58 ERA and a 1.01 WHIP.

Lynch spent 2019 with the Wilmington Blue Rocks of the Class A-Advanced Carolina League and was named a Carolina League All-Star midway through the season. Over 15 starts, he went 5–2 with a 3.10 ERA. He was selected to play in the Arizona Fall League for the Surprise Saguaros following the season, earning All-Star honors. He did not play any minor league games in 2020 due to the cancellation of the minor league season caused by the COVID-19 pandemic.

On May 2, 2021, the Royals announced that Lynch would be promoted for the next day's game and be the starting pitcher against the Cleveland Indians. Lynch was officially added to the 40-man roster on May 3, and given the number 52.

References

External links

1996 births
Living people
People from Henrico County, Virginia
Baseball players from Virginia
Major League Baseball pitchers
Kansas City Royals players
Virginia Cavaliers baseball players
Orleans Firebirds players
Burlington Royals players
Lexington Legends players
Arizona League Royals players
Wilmington Blue Rocks players
Surprise Saguaros players
Omaha Storm Chasers players